The Brandon Wheat Kings won for the third year in a row, and  fourth in five years. The win on March 8, 1964, in Fort Frances was the first time the Wheat Kings won the Turnbull Memorial Trophy not playing on home ice.

League notes
The MJHL expands to Fort Frances, with the Fort Frances Royals joining the league.

Regular season

All-Star game
The SJHL click for three unanswered goals in the third period, two within 25 seconds, to beat the MJHL 5-2 in the 
3rd annual Manitoba - Saskatchewan all-star game was played in Brandon on February 3. Ron Boehm, Fran Huck, Gary Holland, Wayne Doll, and Larry Mickey scored for Saskatchewan, who with the win, retain the Charlie Gardner Memorial Trophy. Replying for the Manitoba were Jim Irving and Felix LaVallee.
MJHL Lineup:
Goal: Ken Kachulak (Brandon); Ben Harper (Fort Frances)
Defence: Bob Ash (Brandon); Jim Murray (Brandon); George Hayes (Brandon); Terry Ball (Rangers); Bob Howard (Rangers)
Centre: Felix LaVallee (Brandon); Dan Johnson (Fort Frances); Alton White (Rangers) 
Leftwing: Ted Irvine (Braves); Jim Irving (Rangers); Dunc Rousseau (Braves)
Rightwing: John Vopni (Brandon); Freeman Asmundson (Monarchs); Wayne Kitchen (Braves) 
Coach: Ron Maxwell (Brandon); Manager: Bill Addison (Braves)

Playoffs
Semi-Finals
Brandon defeated Rangers 4-games-to-none
Fort Frances defeated Monarchs 4-games-to-none
Turnbull Cup Championship
Brandon defeated Fort Frances 10-points-to-2 (9 point series)
Western Memorial Cup Inter-Provincial Playoff
Brandon  defeated Fort William Canadiens (TBJHL) 4-games-to-2
Western Memorial Cup Semi-Final
Brandon lost to Edmonton Oil Kings (CAHL) 4-games-to-1

Awards

All-Star Teams

References
 Manitoba Junior Hockey League
 Manitoba Hockey Hall of Fame
 Hockey Hall of Fame
 Winnipeg Free Press Archives
 Brandon Sun Archives

MJHL
Manitoba Junior Hockey League seasons